Jack Montrose Sextet is an album by saxophonist Jack Montrose recorded in 1954 for the Pacific Jazz label. The album compiles two previously released 10 inch LPs; Bob Gordon's Meet Mr Gordon and Clifford Brown's Clifford Brown Ensemble.

Reception

In the AllMusic review by Scott Yanow, he states: "Montrose's charts (which are full of unexpected surprises while always swinging and leaving room for plenty of solos) are quite notable and show that, despite the restrained tones, there was plenty of excitement to be found in West Coast jazz".

Track listing
All compositions by Jack Montrose except as indicated
 "Love Is Here to Stay" (George Gershwin, Ira Gershwin) - 2:21
 "Meet Mr. Gordon" - 2:35
 "Onion Bottom" - 3:25
 "For Sue" - 3:45
 "What a Diff'rence a Day Made" (María Grever, Stanley Adams) - 3:36
 "Tea for Two" (Vincent Youmans, Irving Caesar) - 3:02
 "Gone with the Wind" (Allie Wrubel, Herb Magidson) - 3:38
 "Tiny Capers" (Clifford Brown) - 4:14
 "Joy Spring" (Brown) - 3:18
 "Blueberry Hill"(Vincent Rose, Larry Stock, Al Lewis) - 3:17
 "Dahoud" (Brown) - 4:15

Personnel 
Jack Montrose - tenor saxophone 1-6, arranger
Clifford Brown - trumpet (tracks 7-11)
Stu Williamson - valve trombone (tracks 7-11) 
Zoot Sims - tenor saxophone (tracks 7-11) 
Bob Gordon - baritone saxophone  
Russ Freeman (tracks 7-11), Paul Moer (tracks 1-6) - piano
Joe Mondragon (tracks 1-6, 9 & 11), Carson Smith (tracks 7, 8 & 10) - bass
Shelly Manne (tracks 7-11), Billy Schneider (tracks 1-6) - drums

References 

1955 albums
Pacific Jazz Records albums
Jack Montrose albums
Clifford Brown albums
Bob Gordon (saxophonist) albums